Carl Gustaf Grimberg (22 September 1875 in Gothenburg, Sweden – 11 June 1941 in Djursholm) was a Swedish historian.

His parents were Joel Grimberg and Charlotta (née Andersson). In 1919 he married Eva Carlsdotter Sparre (1895–1982).

Grimberg's most famous work is his history of Sweden, Svenska folkets underbara öden (1913-1924). In 1926 Grimberg began to publish his history of the world, Världshistoria, but he did not finish it before his death.

Publications in Norway 

The first Norwegian edition of Grimberg's world history was entitled Menneskenes Liv og Historie, and was published in the years 1955–1962. The publication consisted of 22 volumes. After the mention of the Neanderthals, the history of the world is reproduced from ancient Egypt until the end of the Second World War.

External links
 Carl Grimberg resources

1875 births
1941 deaths
20th-century Swedish historians